Nigel James Thorpe (born 3 October 1945) is a former British diplomat whose final posting was as Ambassador to Hungary.

Diplomatic career
Nigel Thorpe joined the Foreign and Commonwealth Office (FCO) in 1969. He was posted as Third Secretary later Second Secretary to Warsaw in 1970. Three years later he went to Dacca where he was appointed First Secretary. He returned to the FCO in 1975 and was posted in 1979 as First Secretary (Economic) to Ottawa. He was seconded to the Department of Energy in 1981. The following year, he was appointed Assistant Head of the FCO's Southern African Department. In 1985, he was posted as Counsellor and Head of Chancery to Warsaw. He was appointed Ambassador to Hungary in 1998.

Post retirement
Following his retirement from HM Diplomatic Service, Nigel Thorpe remained in Budapest until November 2008 as Chairman of Vodafone Hungary.

Family
In 1969, Nigel Thorpe married Felicity Thompson. They had two sons (1971 and 1972). The marriage was dissolved in 1976. He married Susan Diane Bamforth in 1978. They had twin daughters in 1985.

References

1945 births
Living people
Members of HM Diplomatic Service
Ambassadors of the United Kingdom to Hungary
20th-century British diplomats